The IPP Open is a tennis tournament held in Helsinki, Finland, since 2001. The event is part of the ATP Challenger Tour and is played on indoor hard courts.

Past finals

Singles

Doubles

External links 
 

 
ATP Challenger Tour
Sports competitions in Helsinki